Akbarabad-e Arjomand (also Romanized as Akbarābād-e Ārjomand; also known as Akbarābād) is a village in Azizabad Rural District, in the Central District of Narmashir County, Kerman Province, Iran. At the 2006 census, its population was 54, in 11 families.

References 

Populated places in Narmashir County